The Seventh Federal Electoral District of Chihuahua (VII Distrito Electoral Federal de Chihuahua) is one of the 300 Electoral Districts into which Mexico is divided for the purpose of elections to the federal Chamber of Deputies and one of nine such districts in the state of Chihuahua.

It elects one deputy to the lower house of Congress for each three-year legislative period, by means of the first past the post system.

District territory
Under the 2005 districting scheme, the district covers the municipalities of Bachíniva, Buenaventura, Casas Grandes, Cuauhtémoc, Galeana, Gómez Farías, Guerrero, Ignacio Zaragoza, Madera, Matachí, Moris, Namiquipa, Nuevo Casas Grandes, Ocampo, Riva Palacio and Temósachi.

The district's head town (cabecera distrital), where results from individual polling stations are gathered together and collated, is the city of Cuauhtémoc, Chihuahua.

Previous districting schemes

1996–2005 district
Between 1996 and 2005, Chihuahua's  Seventh  District was located in the centre-west portion of the state and comprised mostly municipalities of the Sierra Tarahumara region: Bachíniva, Batopilas, Bocoyna, Carichí, Chínipas, Cuauhtémoc, Cusihuiriachi, Dr. Belisario Domínguez, Gran Morelos, Guazapares, Guerrero, Maguarichi, Moris, Nonoava, Ocampo, Riva Palacio, San Francisco de Borja, Santa Isabel, Satevó, Uruachi and  Urique.

1979–1996 district
Between 1979 and 1996, the  Seventh  District comprised the southern portion of the state capital, Chihuahua, Chih.

Deputies returned to Congress from this district

LI Legislature
1979–1982:  Demetrio Bernardo Franco Derma (PRI)
LII Legislature
1982–1985:  Juan Manuel Terrazas Sánchez (PRI)
LIII Legislature
1985–1988:  Jorge Doroteo Zapata (PRI)
LIV Legislature
1988–1991:  Carlos Barranco Fuentes (PRI)
LV Legislature
1991–1994:  Eloy Gómez Pando (PRI)
LVI Legislature
1994–1997:  Mario de la Torre Hernández (PRI)
LVII Legislature
1997–2000:  Odórico Vázquez Bernal (PRI)
LVIII Legislature
2000–2003:  Jorge Esteban Sandoval (PRI)
LIX Legislature
2003–2006:  Jorge Castillo Cabrera (PRI)
LX Legislature
2006–2009:  Israel Beltrán Montes (PRI)

Results

References

Federal electoral districts of Mexico
Chihuahua (state)